Haplochela is a genus of moth in the family Gelechiidae.

Species
 Haplochela trigonota Walsingham, 1911

Former species
 Haplochela mundana Meyrick, 1914

References

Chelariini